Villard Glacier is in the U.S. state of Oregon. It is on the northeast slopes of  North Sister, an extinct shield volcano.

See also
 List of glaciers in the United States

References

Glaciers of Oregon
Glaciers of Deschutes County, Oregon